The inaugural New Zealand Screen Awards were held on Wednesday 27 July 2005 at SkyCity Theatre in Auckland, New Zealand. Following the demise of the GOFTA awards, the Screen Directors Guild of New Zealand founded the New Zealand Screen Awards to honour excellence in New Zealand film and television. Due to there having been no film awards in 2004, the eligibility period was from 1 October 2003 to July 2005. In the weeks ahead of the awards presentation, sponsor SkyCity screened a series of nominated short films. The film In My Father's Den was nominated in all 12 of the feature film award categories and won 10 awards.

Nominees and Winners

No finalists were selected for the Feature Film categories Achievement in Production Design, Achievement in Make-Up, Achievement in Special Effects/CGI due to lack of entries.

There were 12 feature film categories, two digital feature categories, four short film categories and 22 television categories.

Feature film 

Best Picture
 In My Father's Den, Trevor Haysom, Dixie Linder (T.H.E Film, Little Bird)Fracture, Charlie McClellan (Savuti Films)
 Perfect Strangers, Robin Laing, Gaylene Preston, Jay Cassells (Gaylene Preston Productions, Huntaway Productions)Achievement in Directing Brad McGann, In My Father's Den
 Larry Parr, 'Fracture'
 Gaylene Preston, 'Perfect Strangers'

Performance by an Actor in a Leading Role
 Matthew Macfadyen, In My Father's Den 
 Sam Neill, Perfect Strangers 
 Andrew Paterson, 50 Ways of Saying Fabulous (MF Films)

Performance by an Actress in a Leading Role
 Emily Barclay, In My Father's Den
 Rachael Blake, Perfect Strangers
 Kate Elliott, Fracture

Performance by an Actor in a Supporting Role
 Colin Moy, In My Father's Den 
 Paul Glover, Fracture 
 Joel Tobeck, Perfect Strangers

Performance by an Actress in a Supporting Role
 Jodie Rimmer, In My Father's Den
 Liddy Holloway, Fracture 
 Jennifer Ward-Lealand, Fracture

Screenplay 
 Brad McGann, In My Father's Den 
 Gaylene Preston, Perfect Strangers

Achievement in Cinematography
 Stuart Dryburgh, In My Father's Den
 Alun Bollinger, Perfect Strangers
 Fred Renata, Fracture

Achievement in Editing
 Chris Plummer, In My Father's Den 
 John Gilbert A.C.E, Perfect Strangers
 Jonathan Woodford-Robinson, Fracture

Achievement in Original Music 
 Victoria Kelly, Fracture 
 Simon Boswell, In My Father's Den 
 Plan 9: David Donaldson, Janet Roddick, Steve Roche, Perfect Strangers

Contribution to a Soundtrack 
 Richard Flynn, Chris Burt, Gethin Creagh, In My Father's Den
 Tim Prebble, Gethin Creagh, Chris Todd, Fracture 
 Ken Saville, Tim Prebble, Mike Hedges, Perfect Strangers

Achievement in Costume Design
 Amanda Neale, Fracture
 Helen Bollinger, Perfect Strangers 
 Kirsty Cameron, In My Father's Den*

Digital feature 

Best Digital Feature 
 Kaikohe Demolition, Florian Habicht (Pictures for Anna) 
 1 Nite, Amarbir Singh, (Indipact Films)Technical Contribution to a Digital Feature 
 Cristobal Araus Lobos, 1 Nite 
 Christopher Pryor, Kaikohe Demolition 
 John Crisstoffels, Offensive Behaviour (Environmentally Hazardous Films)

Short film 

Best Short Film 
 Closer, David Rittey (AJ Films) My Father's Shoes, Samantha Scott (West Coast Film Club)
 No Ordinary Sun, Jonathan Brough (Thin Film)Performance in a Short Film 
 Toby Agnew, Closer
 Norissa Taia, The Little Things (Blueskin Films) 
 Frank Whitten, My Father's Shoes

Script for a Short Film 
 Zia Mandviwalla, Eating Sausage (Comotion Pictures) 
 Jonathan Brough, No Ordinary Sun
 Jochen Fitzherbert, Rest Stop (Killing Time Productions)

Technical Contribution to a Short Film 
 Ashley Turner, No Ordinary Sun 
 James Cowley, Cockle (Exile Films) 
 Simon Reira, No Ordinary Sun

Television 

Best Drama Series 
 The Insider's Guide To Happiness, Dave Gibson, Donna Malane, Jan Haynes (The Gibson Group) Good Hands/Lima Lelei, Paul Simei-Barton, Justine Simei-Barton (Tala Pasifika Productions) 
 Mercy Peak, John Laing, (South Pacific Pictures)Best Comedy Programme 
 bro'Town, Elizabeth Mitchell (Firehorse Films) Moon TV, Leigh Hart (Moon Enterprises)
 Serial Killers – "Big Hairy Balls", Judith Trye (Landtry)Best Documentary 
 Murder on the Blade?, Keith Hunter (Hunter Productions)Haunting Douglas, Shona McCullagh, Leanne Pooley (Spacific Films)
 Reluctant Revolutionary, Tom Scott, Danny Mulheron (Direct Hit Productions)Best Documentary/Factual Series 
 Intrepid Journeys, Melanie Rakena, Jane Andrews (Jam TV)
 He Whare Korero, Tainui Stephens, Wiha Te Raki Hawea (Pito One Productions)
 Mercury Lane, Series II, Philippa Mossman (Greenstone Pictures)Korero Maori Best Maori Language Programme Hawaiki "Nga Waka", Tukoroirangi Morgan (Astraeus NZ) 
 Pukana, Matai Smith, Reikura Morgan (Cinco Cine Film Productions)Best Children's Programme 
 Being Eve, Vanessa Alexander, Anne Williams (South Pacific Pictures) Koi, Chris Winitana (Awekura Productions) 
 The Dress Up Box 3 – Jigsaw, Sue Wolfenden (Papageno Productions)Best Lifestyle/Entertainment Programme 
 The Living Room, Series II, Mark Albiston, Amelia Bardsley (Sticky Pictures) Korero Time 2004 – Juniors, Lanita Ririnui-Ryan (Front of the Box Productions) 
 NZ Goes to Chelsea, Karen Mackenzie, Maggie Barry (Karen Mackenzie)Performance by an Actress Robyn Malcolm, Serial Killers – I am the Resurrection Sophia Hawthorne, The Insider's Guide To Happiness
 Sara Wiseman, Mercy PeakPerformance by a Supporting Actress Denise O'Connell, The Insider's Guide To Happiness
 Fiona Truelove, Good Hands/Lima Lelei
 Tandi Wright, Serial Killers "Control/Alt/Delete"

Performance by an Actor 
 Will Hall, The Insider's Guide To Happiness
 Ben Barrington, The Insider's Guide To Happiness
 John Leigh, Serial Killers "Big Hairy Balls"

Performance by a Supporting Actor 
 Jason Whyte, The Insider's Guide To Happiness 
 Tim Balme, Mercy Peak
 Dean O'Gorman, Killers "Product Placement"

Presenter, Entertainment/Factual 
 Peter Elliott, Explorers (TVNZ)
 Oliver Driver, Frontseat (The Gibson Group)
 Tom Scott, Reluctant Revolutionary

Script, Single Episode of a Drama Series or Serial
 David Brechin-Smith, The Insider's Guide To Happiness – Ep 6
 Paula Boock, Peter Cox, The Insider's Guide To Happiness – Ep 1
 James Griffin, Mercy Peak – Ep 55

Script, Comedy 
 Oscar Kightley, Mario Gaoa, David Fane, Shimpal Lelisi, bro'Town – The Weakest Link/Ep 6 
 David Brechin-Smith, The Strip Series II, Ep 16 (The Gibson Group)
 James Griffin, Serial Killers – "Big Hairy Balls"/Ep 3

Achievement in Directing, Drama/Comedy Programme 
 Mark Beesley, The Insider's Guide To Happiness – Ep 6
 Elizabeth Mitchell, Maka Makatoa, bro'Town – The Weakest Link/Ep 6 
 Mike Smith, Serial Killers "Big Hairy Balls"/Ep 3

Achievement in Directing, Documentary
 Leanne Pooley, Haunting Douglas (Spacific Films) 
 Andrew Bancroft, Mercury Lane, Series II
 Paul Swadel, Colin McCahon: I Am (Screentime)

Achievement in Directing, Factual Programming/Entertainment
 Mark Albiston, The Living Room, Series II 
 Te Arepa Kahi, Hawaiki "Maui"
 Jerome Joseph Cvitanovich, Country Calendar – Oamaru Stone (TVNZ)

Achievement in Camerawork Documentary 
 Peter Young, Explorers (TVNZ)
 Grant Atkinson, Mothers Behind Bars (RSVP Productions)
 David Paul, Long Lost Sons (The Gibson Group)

Achievement in Editing, Documentary
 Tim Woodhouse, Haunting Douglas
 Gaylene Barnes, Out of Sight: Out of Mind (Frank Film) 
 John Fraser, Give it a Whirl (Visionary Film & TV)

Achievement in Original Music 
 David Long, The Insider's Guide To Happiness – Ep 6
 Victoria Kelly, Joost Langveld, Being Eve
 Tom McLeod, Secret Agent Men, Series II – "Days of Chunder" (Greenstone Pictures)

Contribution to a Soundtrack 
 Carl Smith, Travis Hefferen, Being Eve 
 Steve Finnigan, Rodney Larsen, Tom Miskin, Mercy Peak – The Book That I Read (Sound Post)
 Richard Sweeting, Roger Green, Explorers

Contribution to Design
 Euan Frizzell, From Len Lye to Gollum (Colbalt VFX) 
 Zane Holmes, Andrew Shanks, Alistair Crawford, Being Eve
 Nic Smillie, The Insider's Guide To Happiness – Ep 3

References

New Zealand film awards
Screen Awards
New Zealand
July 2005 events in New Zealand